Horacio Carbonetti (born 17 November 1947) is an Argentine professional golfer. He is the brother of golfer Luis Carbonetti.

Carbonetti was born in Río Cuarto, Córdoba. He won multiple amateur tournaments, mostly in Argentina. In 1976, he lost by playoff the Simon Bolivar Cup Professional Championship in Venezuela. He turned professional in 1977.

In his debut tournament as a professional, Carbonetti was second at the Metropolitan Open behind Florentino Molina in 1977. In 1980, he shot a 64 in the second round of The Open Championship, at Muirfield, setting a new course record. He won the Argentine Tour Order of Merit in 1980 and the Cordoba Tour Order of Merit in 2001.  He played on the European Tour from 1978 to 1981.

Carbonetti is currently a member of European Seniors Tour and has won two tournaments on this tour.

Amateur wins
 1967 Rio Cuarto Open
 1968 La Cumbre Open
 1969 Center Open
 1970 Amateur Argentine Open
 1971 Abierto del Litoral, Porto Alegre Open (Brazil)
 1972 Porto Alegre Open (Brazil), Argentine Amateur Championship, Gordon Kenneth Cup, Luis Gestoso Grand Prix, Alvear Grand Prix
 1973 Center Open, Quito City Open (Ecuador)
 1974 San Pablo Open (Brazil), Luis Gestoso Grand Prix, La Cumbre Open
 1975 Acantilados Grand Prix, Santo Domingo Open (Chile), Argentine Amateur Championship
 1976 Simon Bolivar Cup (Venezuela), Mendoza Open, Chaco Open
 1977 Ranelagh Open, Velox Grand Prix, Argentine Amateur Championship, Abierto del Litoral, Fultom Grand Prix

Professional wins (31)

Argentine wins (8)
 1980 Acantilados Grand Prix, Santa Teresita Open, North Open
 1985 JPGA Championship
 1996 Callaway Cup
 2002 Ascochingas Tournament, Villa Mercedes Grand Prix
 2004 Acantilados Grand Prix

Other wins (4)
 1972 Porto Alegre Open (Brazil) (as amateur)
 1984 Rio de Janeiro Cup's (Brazil)
 1985 Los Leones Open (Chile)
 1988 Cali Open (Colombia)

European Senior Tour wins (2)

European Senior Tour playoff record (1–1)

Argentina senior wins (14)
 1997 Argentine Senior Open
 1998 Argentine Senior PGA Championship, South Senior Open
 1999 Argentine Senior Open, La Plata Senior Grand Prix, Roberto de Vicenzo Senior Classic, Fidel De Luca Senior Classic
 2000 Argentine Senior Open
 2001 Argentine Senior Open
 2002 Argentine Senior Open, Acantilados Senior Grand Prix
 2003 Argentine Senior PGA Championship
 2004 Argentine Senior PGA Championship (tie with Adan Sowa)
 2005 Argentine Senior Open

Other senior wins (3)
 1998 Seniors Classic (USA)
 1999 Maryland Senior Open (USA)
 2002 European Senior Tour Qualifying School (Portugal)

Team appearances
Amateur
 Eisenhower Trophy (3): 1972, 1974, 1976
 South American Cup (Los Andes Cup) (9): 1969, 1970, 1971, 1972, 1973 (winners), 1974 (winners), 1975, 1976 (winners), 1977 (winners)
 Hispanidad Cup (2): 1972 (winners), 1974
 Vigil Cup (Argentine) (6): 1967, 1969, 1970, 1975 (winners), 1976 (winners), 1977 (winners)

External links

Argentine male golfers
European Tour golfers
European Senior Tour golfers
Sportspeople from Córdoba Province, Argentina
People from Río Cuarto, Córdoba
1947 births
Living people